The International Institute of Professional Studies, a department of Devi Ahilya University, was set up in 1992. With the quality in the content, scope and professionalism of its programs, IIPS has emerged as one of the best centers of technical education in central India and is recognized by AICTE. It has been placed in the 'A+' category and ranked 24th overall in the Business Standard Survey of best B-Schools of  India.

Campus

International Institute of Professional Studies, a department of Devi Ahilya University is situated at Takshashila campus khandwa road Indore.

Enrolling at IIPS means joining a community rich in diversity and opportunity. The IIPS campus encourages students to share their talents, develop new ones and benefit from the varied social and intellectual backgrounds of their classmates and teachers.

Courses

IIPS offers various under-graduate and post-graduate courses such as MBA, MCA, B.Tech, M.Tech,BBA and B.Com(Hons).
Courses offered in MBA are 
MBA-CORE
MBA-Entrepreneurship
MBA-Tourism 
MBA-Finance
MBA-Marketing
MBA-Production Management

Alumni

IIPS alumni are doing business and jobs across the globe in MNC's.
 Accenture, Infosys, Cognizant, TCS, Wipro, Impetus, WorldPay, Amdocs, FICO, Parkar Consulting & Labs, Walkover, BookMyShow, Urban Ladder, Directi, NSE, Josh Technology Group, VMWare, Cognam Technologies, Ernest and Young etc.

Activity
 List of range of sports, cultural and extracurricul0ar activities available to students.
 Annual management-tech fest "Xpressions" which has been done since 1993 and is a huge event in itself.
 Annual event "Tourista" - annual tourism event on World Tourism Day 88.
 Annual sports event "Synergy" every year in the first half of the calendar year.
 Annual event " FIESTA" eve nt by flagship course IIPS,annual MS(5years) event for welcome,interaction,confidence building and coordination in all students.
 Annual event "Reboot" - annual Mtech event on world engineers day.
 Annual event "Technophilia" - annual event on October- November of each year.

Gallery

References

External links

Devi Ahilya University website
 International Institute of Professional Studies website

All India Council for Technical Education
Business schools in Madhya Pradesh
Information technology schools in India
Technical universities and colleges in India
Universities and colleges in Indore
1992 establishments in Madhya Pradesh
Educational institutions established in 1992